Suarmin, or Asaba, is a Sepik language spoken in Sandaun Province, Papua-New Guinea. Alternative names are Asabano, Akiapmin, Duranmin.

Glottolog leaves it unclassified.

Pronouns
Pronouns are:

{| 
!  !! sg !! du !! pl
|-
! 1incl
|  || adi || abe
|-
! 1excl
| a || nadi || nesine
|-
! 2
| abo || abodua || apa
|-
! 3
| yo || atadua || ata
|}

Noun classes
In Asaba, noun class affixes are suffixed to nouns. There are five noun classes. Examples:

{| 
! class !! singular (ex.) !! plural (ex.) !! gloss (ex.)
|-
| class 1 || nu-bu || nu-le || house(s)
|-
| class 2 || mena-du || mena-no || pig(s)
|-
| class 3 || kabia-si || kabia-le || stone(s)
|-
| class 4 || moko-ni || moko-le || fork(s)
|-
| class 5 || nomo-so || nomo-l || stone adze(s)
|}

Class 1 is the default noun class.

Modifying adjectives agree with head nouns in class:

References

Definitely endangered languages
Papi–Asaba languages
Languages of Sandaun Province
Language isolates of New Guinea